Debden may refer to:

Places

Canada
 Debden, Saskatchewan, Canada

England
 Debden, Epping Forest, a suburb of Loughton, in the Epping Forest district of Essex
 Debden House, a residential adult education college in Loughton, Essex
 Debden tube station, a London Underground station in Loughton, Essex
 Debden, Uttlesford, a small rural village in the Uttlesford district of Essex
 RAF Debden,  a former RAF station near Debden, Uttlesford

See also 
 Deben (disambiguation)